Kirkby-in-Ashfield Central is a former railway station that served the town of Kirkby-in-Ashfield, Nottinghamshire.

History
The station was opened in 1917 by the Mansfield Railway along with Mansfield Central and Sutton-in-Ashfield Central. The line, including its stations, was worked by the Great Central Railway and became part of the LNER in 1923 and subsequently British Railways in 1948.

The station was conventional and spacious.

Most passenger services plied between Nottingham Victoria and Mansfield Central, with some extending to Edwinstowe and Ollerton.

Goods and timetabled passenger services ceased on 3 January 1956, though Summer weekend excursion traffic to Scarborough, Cleethorpes, Skegness and Mablethorpe continued until 1962.

The line through the station was closed on 7 January 1968 and subsequently lifted.

References

Notes

Sources

Further reading

External links
Kirkby-in-Ashfield Central railway station on navigable 1947 O.S. Map

Disused railway stations in Nottinghamshire
Former Great Central Railway stations
Railway stations in Great Britain opened in 1917
Railway stations in Great Britain closed in 1956
Kirkby-in-Ashfield